Qingyuan Subdistrict is an urban subdistrict and the seat of Tianxin District, Changsha City, Hunan Province, China. The subdistrict is located in the east central part of the district, it is bordered to the north by Wenyuan Subdistrict, to the northwest by Xinkaipu Subdistrict, to the west and the southwest by Heishipu Subdistrict, to the south by Guihuaping Subdistrict, to the southeast and the east by Dongjing and Jingwanzi Subdistricts of Yuhua District.

References

Subdistricts of Changsha
Divisions of Tianxin District
County seats in Hunan